Bayr ny Skeddan (Manx Gaelic for "Herring Road") is a walking route in the Isle of Man between the towns of Castletown (Balley Chashtal) and Peel (Purt ny h-Inshey).

From Castletown, about the first  of the route coincides with that of the Millennium Way, in a northerly direction through Ballasalla and Silverdale Glen. At GR274725 the route turns northwest in the direction of the South Barrule, reaching the Round Table after about another . The path continues north downhill through Glen Mooar to the hamlet of Glenmaye and along the cliff top to Peel.

See also
The Millennium Way, a  walk between Castletown and Ramsey
 Raad ny Foillan , a  circular walk which starts and finishes at the Millennium Bridge over Douglas Harbour

References

External links 
 VisitIsleOfMan website

Footpaths of the Isle of Man